Walking the Wire is an album released by American country music singer Dan Seals. It was his first for the Warner Brothers label (ironically, the same label his older brother, Jim Seals, was once signed with as one half of Seals & Crofts).  Three of its four singles charted, which were "Sweet Little Shoe" (peaked at number 62), "Mason Dixon Line" (peaked at number 43), and "When Love Comes Around the Bend" (peaked at number 51). The B-side to "Mason Dixon Line", titled "Be My Angel", was later a non-album single for Lionel Cartwright, peaking at number 63 in late 1992.

Track listing
 "Mason Dixon Line" (Dan Seals) - 3:10
 "When Love Comes Around the Bend" (Josh Leo, Pam Tillis, Mark Wright) - 2:40
 "Someone Else's Dance" (Parker McGee) - 3:58
 "Sneaky Moon" (Bill LaBounty) - 3:20
 "A Good Rain" (Charlie Black, Jenny Yates) - 4:06
 "Sweet Little Shoe" (Jesse Winchester) - 3:29
 "Slower" (Tony Arata) - 3:19
 "Maybe That's Why" (Allen Shamblin) - 3:06
 "The Wire" (Seals) - 3:28
 "We Are One" (Seals) - 4:54

Personnel 
 Dan Seals – lead and backing vocals 
 Steve Gibson – acoustic guitar, mandolin 
 Mark Casstevens-acoustic guitar
 Chris Leuzinger – acoustic guitar
 Billy Joe Walker, Jr. – guitar 
 Larry Byrom- acoustic & electric guitar
 Andrea Zonn-fiddle
 Dennis Burnside – electric piano
 Matt Rollings-Rhodes & synthesizer
 Hargus "Pig" Robbins- acoustic piano, Hammond B3 organ, DX 7
 Mike E. Lawler -keyboards
 Barry Beckett-acoustic piano
 Sonny Garrish-steel guitar
 Weldon Myrick-steel guitar
 John Willis-electric guitar
 Mark O'Connor- fiddle
 David Hungate – bass
 Glenn Worf -bass
 Edgar Meyer-acoustic bass
 Larrie Londin-drums
 Eddie Bayers – drums, tambourine 
 Paul Leim-drums
 Terry McMillan – harmonica, percussion
 Jim Horn – baritone saxophone 
 Kyle Lehning-synthesizer, electric guitar
 John Wesley Riles-backing vocals
 Dennis Wilson – backing vocals
 Curtis Young – backing vocals
 Cindy Richardson Walker- backing vocals
 Carol Chase- backing vocals

Production 
 Producer – Kyle Lehning

Singles

References

1992 albums
Dan Seals albums
Warner Records albums
Albums produced by Kyle Lehning